Immanuel Christian School (abbreviated as SKI) is a Christian school in Pontianak City, West Kalimantan, Indonesia. The school is affiliated with West Kalimantan Christian Church, and has facilities for kindergarten to high school (grade 12) level: Immanuel Christian Kindergarten, Immanuel Christian Primary School, Immanuel Christian Middle School, Immanuel Christian High School, and Immanuel Christian Vocational School. Its motto is "Smart, Wise, Accountable". The school is member of Association of Christian Schools International (ACSI).

References

External links 
 Official website

Christian schools in Indonesia
Schools in West Kalimantan
Buildings and structures in Pontianak
Educational institutions established in 1948
1948 establishments in Indonesia